Flagstaff Gully is a suburb of the City of Clarence in Tasmania, Australia. It is part of greater Hobart. It is located in the hills east of Lindisfarne. The Flagstaff Gully Reservoir is in the area.

There is a substantial Dolerite quarry at Flagstaff Gully producing Blue Metal gravel for road surfaces.

Sport and Recreation
The Clarence Mountain Bike Park includes dirt jumps, mountain cross, dual slalom, downhill and a cross country track and is located on the Flagstaff Gully Road.

There are a few walking trails located in Flagstaff Gully (Geilston Gully Circuit, Pilchers Hill Loop)

The Sporting Shooters Association of Australia Tasmania Inc have the Oakdale Pistol Club Inc located on the Flagstaff Gully Road.

The Hobart Miniature Steam Locomotive Society has a 365 Metre track on Flagstaff Gully Road.

References

City of Clarence